European route E 675 is a European B class road in Romania and Bulgaria, connecting the cities Agigea – Kardam.

Route 
 
 Agigea
 
 Kardam

External links 
 UN Economic Commission for Europe: Overall Map of E-road Network (2007)

699671
Roads in Romania
Roads in Bulgaria